Gonzalo Fernández-Castaño (born 13 October 1980) is a Spanish professional golfer. He has played on the European Tour, winning seven times, and on the PGA Tour.

Early life 
Fernández-Castaño was born in Madrid. He started playing golf at the age of three and had a successful amateur career, winning the 2003 Spanish Amateur Open Championship and achieving the first place in the Spanish amateur ranking in the same year. He represented Spain and Europe in several amateur team competitions, and was in the winning European team at the 2003 and 2004 Palmer Cup.

He turned professional at the end of 2004 after completing Stage One of the European Tour Qualifying School, finishing eighth at the Finals at San Roque Golf Club where he secured his card for the 2005 season.

Professional career 
In his 2005 rookie season on the Tour, he won the KLM Open and the Sir Henry Cotton Rookie of the Year award. In 2006 he won the BMW Asian Open, which was co-sanctioned by the European Tour and the Asian Tour.

In 2007 he won his third European Tour tournament, the Italian Open. He has finished within the top 60 of the Order of Merit in each of his nine seasons on tour to date. He had one win on tour in 2008 at the Quinn Insurance British Masters.

He finished runner-up at the 2009 Estoril Open de Portugal after losing in a playoff to Michael Hoey. He would finish runner-up next week to Scott Strange at the Volvo China Open. He finished second for the third straight week at the Ballantine's Championship, where he lost to Thongchai Jaidee in a 3-way playoff in extremely tough conditions in Korea. He ended the season ranked 17th on the Race to Dubai.

In May 2009 he reached the top 50 of the Official World Golf Ranking for the first time.

In November 2011, he won the Barclays Singapore Open in a playoff. He had previously missed over six months of the season due to a back injury.

Fernández-Castaño won his sixth career European Tour title in September 2012 at the BMW Italian Open. This was also the second time that he had won at this event. Fernández-Castaño overcame a one shot final round deficit to prevail by two strokes over Garth Mulroy after a final round of 64.

In early 2013, Fernández-Castaño played several events on the PGA Tour, finishing third in the Arnold Palmer Invitational on a sponsor's exemption and reaching the 27th place in the Official World Golf Ranking, his best to date. He earned enough money to be eligible for Special Temporary Membership on the PGA Tour, which he accepted. This allowed him unlimited sponsor exemptions for the remainder of the 2013 season. He also finished 10th in the U.S. Open, and concluded the season with more points than the 125th PGA Tour player to earn a place as a full member for 2014. On the European Tour he won the BMW Masters and finished six times in the top-10, missing only one cut in 21 events; he ended the season ranked 7th on the Race to Dubai, his best ever performance to date.

The following season Fernández-Castaño decided to focus on the PGA Tour, playing most of his events in the United States. His best result and only top-10 of the year was in July at the RBC Canadian Open, where he finished tied for the 4th place.

The 2015 season of the PGA Tour proved to be less successful. He missed 15 cuts in 28 events played, finishing only 165th in the Fedex Cup ranking; between September and October he entered the Web.com Tour Finals in an attempt to save his PGA Tour membership, but failed to make an impact and ultimately lost his tour card.

Without his PGA Tour status, Fernández-Castaño decided to stay in the United States in 2016 and play the Web.com Tour hoping to quickly regain access to the major tour. He played 22 events in the regular season with two top-10 finishes, finishing only 64th. Entering for the second year in a row into the Web.com Tour Finals, he managed this time to graduate to the PGA Tour.

Amateur wins
2003 Spanish International Amateur Championship

Professional wins (8)

European Tour wins (7)

*Note: Tournament shortened to 54 holes due to weather.
1Co-sanctioned by the Asian Tour

European Tour playoff record (4–2)

Other wins (1)
2005 Madrid Federation Championship (Peugeot Tour, Spain)

Results in major championships
Results not in chronological order in 2020.

CUT = missed the half-way cut
"T" = tied
NT = No tournament due to COVID-19 pandemic

Summary

Most consecutive cuts made – 5 (2012 Open Championship – 2013 Open Championship)
Longest streak of top-10s – 1

Results in The Players Championship

CUT = missed the halfway cut
"T" indicates a tie for a place

Results in World Golf Championships

QF, R16, R32, R64 = Round in which player lost in match play
"T" = tied
Note that the HSBC Champions did not become a WGC event until 2009.

Team appearances
Amateur
European Boys' Team Championship (representing Spain): 1995, 1996 (winners), 1998
European Amateur Team Championship (representing Spain): 2001, 2003 (winners)
Eisenhower Trophy (representing Spain): 2002
Jacques Léglise Trophy (representing the Continent of Europe): 2002 (non-playing captain)
Palmer Cup (representing Europe): 2003 (winners), 2004 (winners)
Bonallack Trophy (representing Europe): 2004
St Andrews Trophy (representing the Continent of Europe): 2004

Professional
World Cup (representing Spain): 2006, 2009
Seve Trophy (representing Continental Europe): 2007, 2009, 2013 (winners)
Royal Trophy (representing Europe): 2012
EurAsia Cup (representing Europe): 2014

See also
2016 Web.com Tour Finals graduates
2017 European Tour Qualifying School graduates

References

External links

Spanish male golfers
European Tour golfers
PGA Tour golfers
Korn Ferry Tour graduates
Golfers from Florida
Golfers from Madrid
People from Key Biscayne, Florida
1980 births
Living people
20th-century Spanish people
21st-century Spanish people